Sam Sample (born 1941 or 1942) is a former American football coach and player. He served as the head football coach at Dakota Wesleyan University from 1968 to 1971, at Sterling College in Sterling, Kansas from 1974 to 1976, and at Taylor University in Upland, Indiana from 1977 to 1981, compiling a career college football coaching record of 41–66–1. He attended Hastings College in Hastings, Nebraska, where lettered in football, basketball, and track. He signed a contract with the Washington Redskins of the National Football League (NFL) in 1963.

Coaching career
Sample was the head football coach at Sterling College in Sterling, Kansas for three seasons, from 1974 to 1976, compiling a record of 9–18–1.

Head coaching record

References

1940s births
Living people
Dakota Wesleyan Tigers football coaches
Hastings Broncos football players
Hastings Broncos men's basketball players
Sterling Warriors football coaches
Taylor Trojans football coaches
College men's track and field athletes in the United States
People from Nance County, Nebraska
Coaches of American football from Nebraska
Players of American football from Nebraska
Basketball players from Nebraska
Track and field athletes from Nebraska